Mackle ( or Ó Maicill) is a Scottish surname. It comes from the Middle Scots "Meikill" (also spelled "Meikle" or "Mekill"), meaning "big, large". Notable people with the surname include:

Barbara Jane Mackle (born 1948), American heiress and kidnapping victim
Damian Mackle (born 1985), Northern Irish professional wrestler 
Mackle Brothers, American land developers
Marisa Mackle (born c. 1973), Irish novelist

References

Scottish surnames
Surnames of Lowland Scottish origin